Rhian Edmunds (born 4 April 2003) is a British and Welsh track cyclist.

Cycling career
Edmunds became a double British champion when winning the sprint and team sprint events at the 2022 British National Track Championships. Later that year, she claimed bronze in the team sprint at the 2022 Commonwealth Games.

Major results
2022
National Track Championships
1st  Sprint
1st  Team sprint
Commonwealth Games
3rd  Team sprint (with Emma Finucane and Lowri Thomas)

References

2003 births
Living people
British female cyclists
British track cyclists
Welsh track cyclists
Welsh female cyclists
Cyclists at the 2022 Commonwealth Games
Commonwealth Games competitors for Wales
Commonwealth Games medallists in cycling
Commonwealth Games bronze medallists for Wales
Medallists at the 2022 Commonwealth Games